Bernt Jansen is a male former international table tennis player from Germany.

He won a silver medal at the 1969 World Table Tennis Championships in the Swaythling Cup (men's team event) with Wilfried Lieck, Martin Ness and Eberhard Schöler for West Germany.

See also
 List of table tennis players
 List of World Table Tennis Championships medalists

References

German male table tennis players
1949 births
Living people
World Table Tennis Championships medalists
People from Meppen
Sportspeople from Lower Saxony